Aravind Kumar (born 14 July 1962) is a Judge of Supreme Court of India. He is former Chief Justice of Gujarat High Court and Judge of Karnataka High Court.

References 

 Aravind Kumar IARE Topper

Indian judges
1962 births
Living people